Chelsea Lariviere is a paralympic athlete from Canada competing mainly in category T34 sprint events.

Career
Lariviere competed with Team Canada from 1999 until 2006. In 2004 where she gained her silver medal in the 100m behind fellow Canadian Chelsea Clark. She also earned a silver medal in the women's 400 metres and two bronze medals in the 100 and 200 meter race at 2002 World Para Athletics Championships. She later partnered with a Paralympics Ontario program to raise awareness of programs aimed at children with disabilities.

Following the 2006 IPC Athletics World Championships, Lariviere decided to retire from wheelchair athletics and complete her Honours Bachelor of Arts psychology degree at Carleton University.

References

Athletes (track and field) at the 2000 Summer Paralympics
Athletes (track and field) at the 2004 Summer Paralympics
Living people
Paralympic track and field athletes of Canada
Paralympic silver medalists for Canada
Year of birth missing (living people)
Medalists at the 2004 Summer Paralympics
Paralympic medalists in athletics (track and field)
Canadian female wheelchair racers